Hampshire County Council in England is elected every four years. Since the boundary changes in 2005, 78 councillors have been elected from 75 wards, with further boundary changes in 2017.

Political control

Leadership
The leaders of the council since 1976 have been:

Council elections
 2001 Hampshire County Council election
 2005 Hampshire County Council election (boundary changes increased the number of seats by 2)
 2009 Hampshire County Council election
 2013 Hampshire County Council election
 2017 Hampshire County Council election (boundary changes)
2021 Hampshire County Council election

County result maps

By-election results

1997–2001

2001–2005

2009–2013

References

 Hampshire election results
 By-election results

External links
Hampshire County Council

 
Council elections in Hampshire
County council elections in England